Druskininkai Municipality is a municipality in Alytus County, Lithuania.

Elderships 
Druskininkai Municipality is divided into two elderships:

Population by locality

Status: M, MST - city, town / K, GST - village / VS - steading

References

 
Municipalities of Alytus County
Municipalities of Lithuania